Alberto Quiles Piosa (born 27 April 1995) is a Spanish footballer who plays for Deportivo de La Coruña as a forward.

Club career
Born in Huelva, Andalusia, Quiles had youth stints at Recreativo de Huelva and Celta de Vigo. On 24 July 2014 he moved to Córdoba CF, being assigned to the reserves in Segunda División B.

Quiles made his senior debut on 7 September 2014, coming on as a late substitute in a 1–0 home win against Granada CF B. The following 30 January, he was loaned to fellow league team Marbella FC until June.

Returning from loan, Quiles scored a career-best 22 goals during the 2015–16 campaign, as his side achieved promotion from Tercera División. He made his professional debut on 20 November 2016, coming on as a late substitute for Alejandro Alfaro in a 1–1 away draw against CD Mirandés in the Segunda División championship.

On 4 July 2017, Quiles was definitely promoted to the main squad ahead of the 2017–18 season. On 1 August, however, he was loaned to third-tier club UCAM Murcia CF for one year.

Quiles was recalled on 31 January 2018, but appeared mainly for the B's during the remainder of the campaign. On 23 August, he moved to his first team Recreativo on a one-year loan deal.

On 13 July 2019, Quiles signed a permanent deal with Recre after cutting ties with Córdoba.

On 13 June 2021, following Recre unprecedented double relegation to the fifth tier due to restructuring of the Spanish football league system, Quiles signed two-year deal with Primera División RFEF side, Deportivo la Coruña.

References

External links

1995 births
Living people
Footballers from Huelva
Spanish footballers
Association football forwards
Segunda División players
Segunda División B players
Tercera División players
Córdoba CF B players
Marbella FC players
Córdoba CF players
UCAM Murcia CF players
Recreativo de Huelva players